Souheila Yacoub (born 29 June 1992) is a Swiss actress, theatre maker, former rhythmic gymnast, and Miss Suisse Romande 2012 winner.

Life and career
Yacoub was born in Geneva to a Tunisian father and a Flemish mother. She has a sister.

Yacoub attended La Haute école fédérale de sport de Macolin and joined the Swiss National Rhythmic Gymnastics Team as a teenager, competing in the 2009 and 2010 World Rhythmic Gymnastics Championships. She left school at 16 to focus on gymnastics. When the team did not qualify for the Olympics, Yacoub quit the sport altogether. Although she did not officially testify against the coaches amid the 2021 abuse allegations, she supported her former teammates' claims and told a number of stories of the coaches' behaviour, such as limiting how much members could eat or drink and benching them for putting on a kilo.

After quitting, Yacoub returned home. Uncertain what to do next, her sister suggested she apply for Miss Suisse Romande. Yacoub also enrolled in local dance and acting classes. After winning Miss Suisse Romande 2012, Yacoub was offered a scholarship for a three-year programme at the Cours Florent in Paris. She further trained at the CNSAD.

Yacoub made her television debut in six episodes of the France 3 soap opera Plus belle la vie. Upon graduating from the Cours Florent, Yacoub landed her first major theatre role on the Paris stage as Wahida in Wajdi Mouawad's play Tous des oiseaux at Théâtre national de la Colline. She then starred in Gaspar Noé's 2018 horror film Climax and the 2019 Canal+ miniseries Savages.

In 2020, Yacoub appeared in the multilingual internationally co-produced war drama series No Man's Land. She starred in Philippe Garrel's black and white film The Salt of Tears, which premiered at the 70th Berlin International Film Festival, as well as The Braves and A Brighter Tomorrow in 2021.

Yacoub founded theatre company 23h59.

Filmography

Film

Television

Music videos

Stage

Awards and nominations

References

External links

Living people
1992 births
21st-century Swiss actresses
Swiss beauty pageant winners
Swiss expatriates in France
Swiss people of Belgian descent
Swiss people of Tunisian descent
Swiss rhythmic gymnasts